Shuncheng District, is one of the four districts under the administration of the city of Fushun, in Liaoning Province, China.

Administrative Divisions
There are six subdistricts, one town and two townships in the district.

Subdistricts:
Changchun Subdistrict, Hedong Subdistrict, Xinhua Subdistrict, Fushuncheng Subdistrict, Jiangjunbao Subdistrict, Gebu Subdistrict

The only town is Qiandian

Townships:
Hebei Township, Huiyuan Township

References

External links

Fushun
County-level divisions of Liaoning
Districts of China